The Galápagos racer (Pseudalsophis biserialis) is a colubrid snake in the genus Pseudalsophis that is endemic to the Galápagos Islands. It is a mildly venomous constrictor but it is not considered aggressive or harmful to humans. The two subspecies are the eastern and western racers, the latter being larger, longer, and darker than the former. The western subspecies specializes in hunting fish, while both subspecies eat small reptiles, eggs, rodents, and bird hatchlings. The Galapagos racer is near threatened due to recently introduced species that feed on snake eggs, including pigs, rats, mice, and cats. It is one of only three species of snakes on the Galápagos Islands, and it was first described in 1860. In November 2016, a video clip from the BBC series Planet Earth II showing a group of Galápagos racers hunting marine iguana hatchlings became a viral trend.

Taxonomy and etymology
Originally classified as Herpetodryas biserialis by Albert Günther in 1860, this species has been renamed numerous times since then. The generic names have included Dromicus, Orpheomorphus, and Oraphis.

References

External links
 Youtube video of Galápagos racers chasing a marine iguana hatchling, BBC Earth
Youtube video of Galápagos racers chasing marine iguana hatchlings, longer version, France 2

Colubrids
Racer, Galápagos
Galápagos Islands coastal fauna
Reptiles of Ecuador
Reptiles described in 1860
Snakes of South America
Taxa named by Albert Günther